Brandan Wilkinson is a Scotland international rugby league footballer who plays as a  or  for Doncaster in Betfred League 1.

Background
Wilkinson was born in Halifax, West Yorkshire, England.

He is of Scottish descent.

Career
He is a product of the Bradford Bulls Academy system.

Bradford Bulls
2017

Wilkinson featured in the pre-season friendlies against Huddersfield Giants and Keighley Cougars.

Wilkinson featured in Round 1 (Hull Kingston Rovers) to Round 2 (Rochdale Hornets). He then featured in Round 7 (Dewsbury Rams) to Round 12 (Toulouse Olympique). He played in Round 17 (Featherstone Rovers) to Round 18 (Rochdale Hornets) then in Round 21 (Hull Kingston Rovers). Brandan played in the Championship Shield Game 2 (Oldham) to Game 6 (Dewsbury Rams). Wilkinson also played in the 2017 Challenge Cup in Round 4 (Featherstone Rovers). He scored against Dewsbury Rams (1 try).

Statistics
Statistics do not include pre-season friendlies.

References

External links
Doncaster profile
Bradford Bulls profile
2017 RLWC profile

1997 births
Living people
Bradford Bulls players
Doncaster R.L.F.C. players
English people of Scottish descent
English rugby league players
Rugby league locks
Rugby league players from Halifax, West Yorkshire
Rugby league props
Rugby league second-rows
Scotland national rugby league team players